Bront Bird (born March 17, 1989) is a former American football linebacker. He was signed by the San Diego Chargers as an undrafted free agent in 2011. He played college football at Texas Tech. He played high school football at Permian High School in Odessa, Texas where he was a standout at wide receiver and linebacker.

Professional career

San Diego Chargers
After going undrafted in the 2011 NFL Draft, Bront "the Big" Bird was signed by the San Diego Chargers on July 26, 2011. In 2011, Bird recorded 14 total tackles, 11 of them being solo.

External links
San Diego Chargers bio
Texas Tech Red Raiders bio

1989 births
Living people
Players of American football from Texas
American football linebackers
Texas Tech Red Raiders football players
San Diego Chargers players